Máximo Pacheco Gómez (born 26 October 1924−5 May 2012) was a Chilean politician.

He is father of Máximo Pacheco Matte.

References

External Links
 BCN Profile

1924 births
2012 deaths
University of Chile alumni
Sapienza University of Rome alumni
Christian Democratic Party (Chile) politicians
Chilean Ministers of Education
20th-century Chilean politicians
Politicians from Santiago